Ricardo Acioly and Luiz Mattar were the defending champions, but Acioly did not participate this year.  Mattar partnered Ronnie Båthman, losing in the semifinals.

Mansour Bahrami and Tomáš Šmíd won the title, defeating Gustavo Luza and Guillermo Pérez Roldán 6–4, 6–3 in the final.

Seeds

  Claudio Mezzadri /  Diego Pérez (first round)
  Mansour Bahrami /  Tomáš Šmíd (champions)
  Brett Dickinson /  Steve Guy (first round)
  Ronnie Båthman /  Cássio Motta (semifinals)

Draw

Draw

References
Draw

Doubles